PlayN is an open source Java software framework and set of libraries intended to create multi-platform games and distributed under the Apache License 2.0. It was started on January 19, 2011 as a game abstraction library built over GWT and was previously named Forplay. As of March 2019, its current version is 2.0.5.

History 
Forplay was created in January 2011. In August 2011, the project was forked and rebranded as PlayN.

Name 
The name PlayN comes from the project's motto "Cross platform game library for N>=5 platforms", as it claims to build games for five platforms: Java SE, HTML 5, Flash, Android and iOS.

References

External links 
 PlayN google code site: code.google.com/p/playn
 Forplay google code site: code.google.com/p/forplay
 PlayN platform overview playn-2011.appspot.com
 PlayN tutorial with code samples: proppy-playn101.appspot.com
 PlayN Google Plus community: plus.google.com/communities/103644414672868334044
 PlayN Google Groups forum: groups.google.com/forum/#!forum/playn

Videos
 Cross Platform Game Programming with PlayN - New Game 2011 
 Introducing PlayN 

Java platform